Janiya or Jania is an uncommon female given name of Hebrew origin and meaning from Jana. The name may be Arabic, and could possible be related to name Jana, Jane, Janie. Names that sound similar are Tania and Taniya.

People so named include:
Jania Aubakirova, Kazakhstani pianist

See also
 Jania (disambiguation), a number of villages in Poland

Hebrew-language names
Feminine given names